Deborah & Clare were bespoke shirtmakers based in Beauchamp Place, London SW3 from 1965 to 1975. Examples of their work are in the Victoria & Albert Museum.

History
Deborah Wood and Clare Bewicke set up business together as designers in 1965, working from a condemned basement in Walton Street, Chelsea. Observing a general lack of innovation in men's clothes they moved into the specialised field of bespoke shirts, using a Greek shirtmaker in London's East End. Until this time custom-made men's shirts were largely the preserve of Jermyn Street, catering to a traditional elite.

The shop soon became known for contemporary design within the classic art of shirtmaking. Sample books of fine English shirtings sat reassuringly on the desk alongside more sensual cloths from the collections of Europe's most sophisticated textile manufacturers.

A visit to New York in 1967 produced an offer of backing from Ahmet Ertigan to open a London shop, but his pre-requisite that the shop also carried the entire range of Levi jeans was dismissed as "much too serious," and the eventual backing came from David Astor.

Shirtmakers trained in Jermyn Street were found after a lengthy search. Andy and Annie Mullins, who had between them the vital skills of Cutter and Collar-maker. "It's two girls on the game," Andy told his wife "making shirts as a cover up." Alan Holston, poached from Dandie Fashions in Kings Road became the popular manager. The shop was designed by David Mlinaric, and opened in December 1967. Terracotta walls with putty-coloured paintwork were the backdrop for polished glass shelves of stock shirts and racks of cloth. It was a cave of colour, and No 29 Beauchamp Place became one of the trendiest venues in London, attracting a global clientele of all persuasion.

Deborah sold out to Clare in 1973, and Clare left the business in 1975.

Deborah, as head designer of clothes and textiles played a leading role in the Laura Ashley story for ten years from 1978. Clare trained as a polarity therapist and went on to practice in the world of complementary medicine.

Examples of Deborah & Clare shirts are in the Victoria & Albert Museum.

References
 The Cutting Edge 50 Years of British Fashion P108
 Sunday Times Magazine 2 August 1970 cover
 Stern Journal No 52 1969 P 109
 The Times Friday 11 July 1969
 Evening Standard Monday 24 March 1975 'Leaving their shirts behind'
 Weekend Telegraph Saturday 26 December 1998 ' the shirt of my Dreams' Rory Knight Bruce
 Nicky Panicci collection of over 200 vintage Deborah & Clare men's shirts

Clothing companies based in London
Clothing companies of England
Clothing retailers of England
English fashion designers
British women fashion designers
Shirts
British companies established in 1965
Clothing companies established in 1965
Manufacturing companies disestablished in 1975
1965 establishments in England
1975 disestablishments in England
Defunct companies based in London
1960s fashion
1970s fashion